The 1992 1000 km of Suzuka was the fifth race of the FIA Sportscar World Championship.  It was run on August 30, 1992.

This event allowed for cars from the All Japan Sports Prototype Championship (JSPC) to participate in their own class.

Official results

Class winners in bold.  Cars failing to complete 90% of winner's distance marked as Not Classified (NC).

Statistics
 Pole Position - #2 Peugeot Talbot Sport - 1:43.957
 Fastest Lap - #2 Peugeot Talbot Sport - 1:50.660
 Average Speed - 182.228 km/h

External links
 Official Results

1000km Of Suzuka, 1992
Suzuka